Seguin is an unincorporated community in Sheridan County, Kansas, United States.  It is located in Logan Township, approximately 10 miles west of Hoxie.  It lies south of U.S. Route 24, to which it is linked by Kansas Highway 188.

History
A post office was opened in Seguin in 1889, and remained in operation until it was discontinued in 1943.  In 1910, the population was 11.  The community was primarily settled by German Catholics.

The 99-mile Plainville-Colby branch of the Union Pacific Railroad which passed through Seguin and dated from the late 1880s, was abandoned in 1998.

Education
The community is served by Hoxie USD 412 public school district.

References

Further reading

External links
 Official community website
 Aftermath of 1925 Tornado in Seguin, Kansasmemory.org
 Sheridan County maps: Current, Historic, KDOT

Unincorporated communities in Sheridan County, Kansas
Unincorporated communities in Kansas